Gouanan is a rural commune in the Cercle of Yanfolila in the Sikasso Region of southern Mali. The commune covers an area of 1747 square kilometers and includes 35 villages. In the 2009 census it had a population of 24,704. The village of Yorobougoula, the administrative center (chef-lieu) of the commune, is 34 km southeast of Yanfolila.

References

External links
.

Communes of Sikasso Region